Cuando besa mi marido is a 1950 Argentine romantic comedy film directed by Carlos Schlieper.

Cast
Malisa Zini
Ángel Magaña
Juan Carlos Thorry
Amelita Vargas
Alberto de Mendoza
Marga Landova
Carlos Enríquez
Aurelia Ferrer
Nélida Romero
Hilda Rey

References

External links
 

1950 films
1950s Spanish-language films
Argentine black-and-white films
Argentine romantic comedy films
1950 romantic comedy films
1950s Argentine films